Esch-sur-Sûre is a commune and small town in north-western Luxembourg. It is part of the canton of Wiltz, which is part of the district of Diekirch. At one point it was the second smallest commune by area in Luxembourg (after Remich), until Neunhausen and Heiderscheid were merged into it in 2011.

, the town of Esch-sur-Sûre, which lies in the north of the commune, has a population of 314.

Esch-sur-Sûre is situated by the river Sauer, just east and downstream of the artificial Upper Sauer Lake. The town's prominent AD 927 castle, and the main part of the town below, sit on a spur of a land within a sharp meander of the river.

The suffix to its name distinguishes Esch-sur-Sûre from the city of Esch-sur-Alzette, which is often known just as Esch.

Immediately above the town, the river has been dammed to form a hydroelectric reservoir extending some 6 miles (10 km) up the valley. The Upper Sauer dam was built in the 1960s to meet the country's drinking water needs.

Populated places
The commune consists of the following villages:

 Esch-sur-Sûre Section:
 Esch-sur-Sûre

 Heiderscheid Section:
 Dirbach
 Eschdorf
 Heiderscheid
 Fond de Heiderscheid
 Merscheid
 Ringel
 Tadler
 Hierheck (lieu-dit)

 Neunhausen Section:
 Bonnal
 Insenborn
 Lultzhausen
 Neunhausen
 Bourgfried (lieu-dit)

Population

References

External links

 
 www.petitbourg.lu Le Paradis des Ardennes Luxembourgoises

Communes in Wiltz (canton)
Towns in Luxembourg